The 1989–90 Segunda División B season was the 13th since its establishment. The first matches of the season were played on 2 September 1989, and the season ended on 27 May 1990.

Overview before the season
80 teams joined the league, including four relegated from the 1988–89 Segunda División and 19 promoted from the 1988–89 Tercera División. The composition of the groups was determined by the Royal Spanish Football Federation, attending to geographical criteria.

Relegated from Segunda División
Barcelona Atlètic
Alzira
Lleida
Mollerussa

Promoted from Tercera División

Cambados
Sporting Atlético
Laredo
Santurtzi
Girona
Manlleu
Benidorm
Moscardó
Numancia
Estepona
Utrera
Mallorca Atlético
Ibiza
Salud
Orihuela
Mérida
Mirandés
Barbastro
Toledo

Group 1
Teams from Asturias, Castile and Leon, Castilla–La Mancha, Galicia and Madrid.

Teams

League table

Results

Top goalscorers

Top goalkeepers

Group 2
Teams from Andorra, Aragon, Basque Country, Cantabria, Catalonia, Castile and Leon, La Rioja and Navarre.

Teams

League table

Results

Top goalscorers

Top goalkeepers

Group 3
Teams from Andalusia, Canary Islands, Castilla–La Mancha, Ceuta, Extremadura and Melilla.

Teams

League table

Results

Top goalscorers

Top goalkeepers

Group 4
Teams from Balearic Islands, Catalonia, Region of Murcia and Valencian Community.

Teams

League table

Results

Top goalscorers

Top goalkeepers

External links
Futbolme.com

Segunda División B seasons
3
Spain